The North American Nations Cup was the association football (soccer) championship for the CONCACAF's North American Zone.

Overview
The tournament was seen as a disappointment, with promoters complaining that the Mexico Football Federation's decision to send their first choice team to play against Argentina in Buenos Aires had a severe effect on attendances. Promoter ProLinks Vice-President Fred Guzman commented that "We're disappointed because we expected Mexico's fans to carry the tournament. But where were the U.S. fans? The U.S. federation has to create a situation where people rally around the national team."

The Los Angeles Times reported that "not even Latinos bought the North American Nations Cup, which, in its second year, is having trouble holding the interest even of the three teams involved."

To prepare for the competition the US team played against Bermuda in Hamilton and Paraguayan club side Olimpia. Following the competition's completion, Bruce Murray was the U.S. all-time highest goalscorer with 13 goals.

Venues

Results

ScorersTwo goals Bruce Murray
 Dante Washington
 Luís Roberto AlvesOne goal'
  Missael Espinoza
  Luis Antonio Valdéz
 Pedro Duana

References

External links
 Tournament results
 Match results

1991
1991
1991 in CONCACAF football
1991 in American soccer
1991 in Canadian soccer
1990–91 in Mexican football